Nicolas Batum (born December 14, 1988) is a French professional basketball player for the Los Angeles Clippers of the National Basketball Association. He is also a member of the French national team and earned a silver medal in the 2020 Summer Olympics in Tokyo.

Early life
His father, Richard, of Cameroonian origin, was a professional basketball player in France. Richard died during a game in 1991 after suffering an aneurysm. Nicolas, at only 2 1/2 years old, and his mother were in the crowd to witness Richard’s death.

Recruiting 
Batum delivered an impressive performance at the 2007 Nike Hoop Summit scoring 23 points (9/13 FG, 3/5 for 3 pointers) in 28 minutes. He also grabbed four rebounds and recorded four steals.

As a youngster, Nicolas Batum was considered one of the most talented young players in Europe, as he was ranked #17 among international players born in 1988, by the scouting website DraftExpress.com at the time he entered the 2008 NBA draft.

Professional career

Le Mans Sarthe (2006–2008) 
Batum was part of the junior French national team that won the 2004 FIBA Europe Under-16 Championship. He was named the MVP of the 2006 FIBA Europe Under-18 Championship, as France won the gold medal at that tournament.

In 2006, Batum was named the most valuable player of the Under-18 Albert Schweitzer Tournament in Mannheim, Germany, as part of the tournament-winning French national team. Batum averaged 19 points, over 5 rebounds, and over 2 steals per game, during the seven game tournament.

While playing for Le Mans, Batum averaged 3.4 points (65.9% FG), 2.5 rebounds, 0.5 assist per game in 13 minutes for the 2006–2007 French league season, and 12.3 points (52.3%), 5.0 rebounds and 3.6 assists per game in 28 minutes for the 2007–2008 season.

Portland Trail Blazers (2008–2011)

Upon being selected with the 25th pick in the 2008 NBA draft by the Houston Rockets, Batum was traded to the Portland Trail Blazers for the rights to Darrell Arthur and Joey Dorsey.

After coming off the bench for the first three games of his NBA career, Batum moved into the starting lineup in place of Travis Outlaw in Portland's fourth game of the 2008–09 season, a 103–96 loss to the Utah Jazz. On March 13, 2009, Batum recorded a season-high 20 points to go along with a clutch three-pointer with 29.9 seconds left, en route to a 109–100 victory over the New Jersey Nets.

Batum missed the first 45 games of the 2009–10 season due to torn cartilage in his right shoulder. He played in his first game of the season on January 25, 2010.

Batum scored more than 30 points for the first time with a 31-point performance (including 7 rebounds, 7 assists, and 3 steals) on February 27, 2010 against the Minnesota Timberwolves.

SLUC Nancy (2011) 
In August 2011, during the 2011 NBA lockout, he signed a one-year contract with SLUC Nancy in French Basketball League which was valid until the NBA lockout ended.

Return to Portland (2011–2015) 
Batum returned to Portland after the lockout ended.

On June 25, 2012, the Portland Trail Blazers extended a qualifying offer to Batum, making him a restricted free agent. Less than three weeks later Batum signed a $46 million/4 year offer sheet with the Minnesota Timberwolves. On July 18, 2012, the Trail Blazers elected to match the Timberwolves' offer, signing Batum to the team through the 2015–16 campaign.

On November 16, 2012, Batum tied a career-high of 35 points in a 119–117 overtime win against the Houston Rockets. This was followed exactly one month later by a game in which Batum recorded the 15th "five-by-five" in the NBA since the 1985–86 season, and the first since Andrei Kirilenko in January 2006. In this effort Batum scored 11 points while racking up 10 assists, 5 rebounds, 5 blocks and 5 steals in a 95–94 win against the New Orleans Hornets.

On January 21, 2013, Batum recorded his first triple-double in a 98–95 loss to the Washington Wizards, scoring 12 points and adding 10 rebounds, and 11 assists, in addition to 3 steals and 2 blocks.

Batum had a career year in 2012–13, as he finished with career-highs in nearly every statistic. His biggest improvement was his passing; he averaged 4.9 assists, more than triple his previous career-high (1.5 assists per game during the 2010–11 season).

Charlotte Hornets (2015–2020)
On June 24, 2015, Batum was traded to the Charlotte Hornets in exchange for Gerald Henderson, Jr. and Noah Vonleh. On August 1, 2015, Batum played for Team Africa at the 2015 NBA Africa exhibition game. He made his debut for the Hornets in the team's season opener against the Miami Heat on October 28, recording 9 points and 6 rebounds in a 104–94 loss. On November 15, he scored a season-high 33 points in a 106–94 win over the Portland Trail Blazers. The following day, he was named Eastern Conference Player of the Week for games played Monday, November 9 through Sunday, November 15. It was the first career Player of the Week award for Batum, who led the Hornets to a 3–1 record on the week. On December 9, he recorded his fifth career triple-double with 10 points, 11 rebounds and 11 assists in a 99–81 win over the Miami Heat. In early January, he missed four games with a right toe injury. Later that month, he missed three more games with the same injury. On March 29, he recorded his second triple-double of the season with 19 points, 12 rebounds and 12 assists in a 100–85 win over the Philadelphia 76ers. On April 20, Batum's first season with the Hornets came to an end after he suffered another injury, this time a sprained left ankle in Game 2 of the Hornets' first-round playoff series with the Miami Heat.

On July 7, 2016, Batum re-signed with the Hornets on a five-year, $120 million contract. On December 23, 2016, he recorded his first triple-double of the season with 20 points, 11 rebounds and 10 assists in a 103–91 win over the Chicago Bulls.

On October 5, 2017, Batum was ruled out for six to eight weeks with a tear of the ulnar collateral ligament in his left elbow. Batum made his season debut on November 15, 2017, scoring 16 points in 32 minutes as a starter in a 115–107 loss to the Cleveland Cavaliers. A week later, Batum left the Hornets' game against the Washington Wizards in the second quarter with a left elbow contusion and did not return. On January 31, 2018, he had 10 points, 11 rebounds and 10 assists in a 123–110 win over the Atlanta Hawks. On March 10, 2018, he recorded 29 points, 12 rebounds and seven assists in a 122–115 win over the Phoenix Suns. Five days later, he recorded a career-high 16 assists to go with 10 points and 10 rebounds in a 129–117 win over the Hawks. On October 24, 2019, Batum was sidelined for two to three weeks due to an avulsion fracture on the third finger of his left hand.

Batum was waived by the Hornets November 29, 2020.

Los Angeles Clippers (2020–present)
On December 1, 2020, after clearing waivers, Batum signed with the Los Angeles Clippers.

On August 13, 2021, Batum re-signed with the Clippers.

On July 6, 2022, Batum re-signed with the Clippers on a two-year deal.

Player profile
Lanky and agile, Batum is regarded as a highly skilled defensive player and one of the NBA's best executors of the chase-down block. Growing up in Pont-l'Évêque, Normandy, the lanky Batum was among the tallest boys of his age group and began his basketball career as a center. Inspiration had been drawn from NBA shot-blocking specialist Dikembe Mutombo, known for theatrically wagging his finger after rejections — an affectation which Batum emulated.

Batum noted in a 2013 interview with the Portland Oregonian that, as he got older, he was moved from the low post to the wing, where he was no longer able to make the face-up block, a signature component of his game. "I couldn't block it like I used to when I played inside, so when I would see a guy going down the court on a fast break, I used to run behind him and get the block".

The chase-down block thus became a fundamental part of Batum's game and was a skill brought with him to the NBA. Through March 2013, only two players in the 2012–13 season who did not play center or power forward had performed more blocks than Batum — Josh Smith and Kevin Durant.

On May 31, 2021, Batum started for Los Angeles Clippers as a center of the lineup against Dallas Mavericks in game four of the 2021 NBA playoffs.

National team career

2012 Summer Olympics
Batum played for the senior men's French national basketball team at the 2012 Summer Olympics. Late in a 66–59 quarterfinal loss to Spain, a frustrated Batum punched Spanish player Juan Carlos Navarro in the groin. After the game, Batum said, "I wanted to give him a good reason to flop." Batum later apologized on Twitter, writing, "I showed a bad image of France and myself. and the city of Portland Oregon.  Congrats to team Spain."

2014 FIBA World Cup
Batum was a member of the French national team that finished third-place in the 2014 FIBA Basketball World Cup, becoming the first French team to win a medal in a FIBA Basketball World Cup competition. In the final two games he averaged 31.0 points and was subsequently named to the all-tournament team.

2020 Summer Olympics
Batum blocked Klemen Prepelič at the last second of the 2020 Olympics semi final giving victory to France. France eventually lost the final 82–87 to the United States. Rudy Gobert stated that Batum's game-saving play was one of the best blocks he had ever seen. His block was ranked as one of the unforgettable moments of the 2020 Summer Olympics.

French national team individual awards and honors
 FIBA Basketball World Cup:  (2014)
 FIBA EuroBasket:  (2013)
 FIBA EuroBasket:  (2011) 
 FIBA Europe Under-18 Championship:  2006
 FIBA Under-19 World Cup:  2007
 FIBA World Cup All-Tournament Team: 2014
 FIBA Europe Under-18 Championship MVP: 2006
 FIBA Europe Under-18 All-Tournament Team: 2006

Career statistics

NBA

Regular season

|-
| style="text-align:left;"|
| style="text-align:left;"|Portland
| 79 || 76 || 18.4 || .446 || .369 || .808 || 2.8 || .9 || .6 || .5 || 5.4
|-
| style="text-align:left;"|
| style="text-align:left;"|Portland
| 37 || 25 || 24.8 || .519 || .409 || .843 || 3.8 || 1.2 || .6 || .7 || 10.1
|-
| style="text-align:left;"|
| style="text-align:left;"|Portland
| 80 || 67 || 31.5 || .455 || .345 || .841 || 4.5 || 1.5 || .9 || .6 || 12.4
|-
| style="text-align:left;"|
| style="text-align:left;"|Portland
| 59 || 34 || 30.4 || .451 || .391 || .836 || 4.6 || 1.4 || 1.0 || 1.0 || 13.9
|-
| style="text-align:left;"|
| style="text-align:left;"|Portland
| 73 || 73 || 38.5 || .423 || .372 || .848 || 5.6 || 4.9 || 1.2 || 1.1 || 14.3
|-
| style="text-align:left;"|
| style="text-align:left;"|Portland
| 82 || 82 || 36.0 || .465 || .361 || .803 || 7.5 || 5.1 || .9 || .7 || 13.0
|-
| style="text-align:left;"|
| style="text-align:left;"|Portland
| 71 || 71 || 33.5 || .400 || .324 || .857 || 5.9 || 4.8 || 1.1 || .6 || 9.4
|-
| style="text-align:left;"|
| style="text-align:left;"|Charlotte
| 70 || 70 || 35.0 || .426 || .348 || .849 || 6.1 || 5.8 || .9 || .6 || 14.9
|-
| style="text-align:left;"|
| style="text-align:left;"|Charlotte
| 77 || 77 || 34.0 || .403 || .333 || .856 || 6.2 || 5.9 || 1.1 || .4 || 15.1
|-
| style="text-align:left;"|
| style="text-align:left;"|Charlotte
| 64 || 64 || 31.0 || .415 || .336 || .831 || 4.8 || 5.5 || 1.0 || .4 || 11.6
|-
| style="text-align:left;"|
| style="text-align:left;"|Charlotte
| 75 || 72 || 31.4 || .450 || .389 || .865 || 5.2 || 3.3 || .9 || .6 || 9.3
|-
| style="text-align:left;"|
| style="text-align:left;"|Charlotte
| 22 || 3 || 23.0 || .346 || .286 || .900 || 4.5 || 3.0 || .8 || .4 || 3.6
|-
| style="text-align:left;"|
| style="text-align:left;"|L.A. Clippers
| 67 || 38 || 27.4 || .464 || .404 || .828 || 4.7 || 2.2 || 1.0 || .6 || 8.1
|-
| style="text-align:left;"|
| style="text-align:left;"|L.A. Clippers
| 59 || 54 || 24.8 || .463 || .400 || .658 || 4.3 || 1.7 || 1.0 || .7 || 8.3
|- class="sortbottom"
| style="text-align:center;" colspan="2"|Career
| 915 || 806 || 30.6 || .436 || .363 || .837 || 5.1 || 3.5 || 1.0 || .6 || 11.1

Playoffs

|-
| style="text-align:left;"|2009
| style="text-align:left;"|Portland
| 6 || 5 || 10.5 || .556 || .500 || .000 || .5 || .2 || .2 || .3 || 2.0
|-
| style="text-align:left;"|2010
| style="text-align:left;"|Portland
| 6 || 6 || 23.2 || .459 || .429 || .750 || 3.2 || .8 || .3 || .0 || 8.2
|-
| style="text-align:left;"|2011
| style="text-align:left;"|Portland
| 6 || 0 || 25.2 || .413 || .269 || .750 || 1.7 || 1.3 || .8 || .8 || 8.0
|-
| style="text-align:left;"|2014
| style="text-align:left;"|Portland
| 11 || 11 || 41.7 || .472 || .350 || .800 || 7.6 || 4.8 || 1.3 || .5 || 15.2
|-
| style="text-align:left;"|2015
| style="text-align:left;"|Portland
| 5 || 5 || 41.8 || .343 || .333 || .769 || 8.6 || 5.2 || .2 || .2 || 14.2
|-
| style="text-align:left;"|2016
| style="text-align:left;"|Charlotte
| 5 || 2 || 28.8 || .378 || .273 || .850 || 3.6 || 2.0 || .4 || .0 || 11.4
|-
| style="text-align:left;"|2021
| style="text-align:left;"|L.A. Clippers
| 19 || 10 || 29.2 || .486 || .389 || .826 || 5.5 || 2.1 || 1.3 || .5 || 8.1
|- class="sortbottom"
| style="text-align:center;" colspan="2"|Career
| 58 || 39 || 29.7 || .441 || .352 || .807 || 4.9 || 2.4 || .8 || .4 || 9.6

EuroLeague

|-
| style="text-align:left;"|2006–07
| style="text-align:left;" rowspan="2"|Le Mans
| 12 || 2 || 13.5 || .500 || .273 || .769 || 1.7 || .7 || .8 || .4 || 4.3 || 4.6
|-
| style="text-align:left;"|2007–08
| 13 || 13 || 26.6 || .453 || .290 || .667 || 3.5 || 2.7 || 1.5 || .5 || 8.5 || 9.6
|-
| style="text-align:left;"|2011–12
| style="text-align:left;"|Nancy
| 6 || 6 || 37.6 || .415 || .333 || .818 || 6.7 || 5.2 || 1.7 || .7 || 15.8 || 23.2
|- class="sortbottom"
| style="text-align:center;" colspan="2"|Career
| 31 || 21 || 23.6 || .449 || .298 || .765 || 3.4 || 2.4 || 1.2 || .5 || 8.3 || 10.3

Personal life
His father, Richard, of Cameroonian origin, was a professional basketball player in France. Richard died during a game in 1991 after suffering an aneurysm. Nicolas, at only 2 1/2 years old, and his mother were in the crowd to witness Richard’s death. Batum has a younger sister named Pauline.

In March 2017, Batum became a shareholder in Infinity Nine Sports, the company owned by Tony Parker, which runs French basketball club ASVEL Basket, and took over the position as director of basketball operations at ASVEL.

See also
 List of European basketball players in the United States

References

External links

 Nicolas Batum at euroleague.net
 Nicolas Batum at fiba.com
 

1988 births
Living people
2010 FIBA World Championship players
2014 FIBA Basketball World Cup players
2019 FIBA Basketball World Cup players
Basketball players at the 2012 Summer Olympics
Basketball players at the 2016 Summer Olympics
Basketball players at the 2020 Summer Olympics
Black French sportspeople
Charlotte Hornets players
French expatriate basketball people in the United States
French men's basketball players
French sportspeople of Cameroonian descent
Houston Rockets draft picks
Le Mans Sarthe Basket players
Los Angeles Clippers players
Medalists at the 2020 Summer Olympics
National Basketball Association players from France
Olympic basketball players of France
Olympic medalists in basketball
Olympic silver medalists for France
People from Lisieux
Portland Trail Blazers players
Shooting guards
SLUC Nancy Basket players
Small forwards
Sportspeople from Calvados (department)